Demoulia is a genus of sea snails, marine gastropod mollusks in the family Nassariidae, the Nassa mud snails or dog whelks.

Species
Species within the genus Demoulia include:
 Demoulia abbreviata (Gmelin, 1791)
 † Demoulia conglobata (Brocchi, 1814) 
 Demoulia obtusata (Link, 1807)
 † Demoulia pupa (Brocchi, 1814) 
 Demoulia ventricosa (Lamarck, 1816)
 Species brought into synonymy 
 Demoulia kurodai Tomlin, 1932 : synonym of Nassarius sufflatus (Gould, 1860)
 Demoulia pulchra Gray, 1838 : synonym of Demoulia obtusata (Link, 1807)
 Demoulia retusa (Lamarck, 1822): synonym of Demoulia ventricosa (Lamarck, 1816)

References

 Vaught, K.C. (1989). A classification of the living Mollusca. American Malacologists: Melbourne, FL (USA). . XII, 195 pp
 Gofas, S.; Le Renard, J.; Bouchet, P. (2001). Mollusca, in: Costello, M.J. et al. (Ed.) (2001). European register of marine species: a check-list of the marine species in Europe and a bibliography of guides to their identification. Collection Patrimoines Naturels, 50: pp. 180–213

External links
 Gray, J.E. (1838). On some new species of quadrupeds and shells. Annals of Natural History. ser. 1, 1: 27-30
 Galindo, L. A.; Puillandre, N.; Utge, J.; Lozouet, P.; Bouchet, P. (2016). The phylogeny and systematics of the Nassariidae revisited (Gastropoda, Buccinoidea). Molecular Phylogenetics and Evolution. 99: 337-353

Nassariidae